Povarovo is an urban locality (a suburban (dacha) settlement) in Solnechnogorsky District of Moscow Oblast, Russia, located  from the federal city of Moscow. Population: 

Its nearest railway station is Povarovo-1 on the Moscow–Saint Petersburg line.

The UVB-76 radio transmitter was thought to be located near Povarovo.

References

Urban-type settlements in Moscow Oblast